Athos Fava (1925-2016) was an Argentine communist. He was the General Secretary of the Communist Party of Argentina from 1980 to 1989, and the head of international relations for the party.

Fava authored works such as Memoria Militante (Militant Memory), Que es el Partido Comunista (What is the Communist Party?) and Reflexiones de un dirigente comunista (Reflections of a Communist Leader).

External links
Article on his 80th birthday celebrations

1925 births
2016 deaths
Place of birth missing
Communist Party of Argentina politicians